The vehicle registration plates of São Tomé and Príncipe is a legal form requiring the citizens of São Tomé and Príncipe to have the car registered. 

The license plate São Tomé and Príncipe repeated former Portuguese standard «STP-00-00». Since 2001, this combination added suffix with one letter. The current standard has the form «STP-12-34A». Standard license plates made with white characters on a black background.

External links
 License plates of São Tomé and Príncipe

Sao Tome and Principe